The 2021 Upper Austrian state election was held on 26 September 2021 to elect the members of the Landtag of Upper Austria.

The Austrian People's Party (ÖVP) remained the largest party with small gains. Of the six parties which won seats in the Landtag, the Freedom Party of Austria (FPÖ) was the only one to suffer losses, falling from 31% of votes to 20%. The Social Democratic Party of Austria (SPÖ) recorded minimal change compared to 2015 and remained in third place with 19%, tying the FPÖ with 11 seats. The Greens improved their performance to over 12%. NEOS – The New Austria narrowly passed the electoral threshold and entered the Landtag for the first time with 4%. Unexpectedly, the anti-vaccination MFG party won 6% and three seats.

Background
The Upper Austrian constitution mandates that cabinet positions in the state government (state councillors) be allocated between parties proportionally in accordance with the share of votes won by each; this is known as Proporz. As such, the government is a perpetual coalition of all parties that qualify for at least one state councillor. Despite this, parties still establish formal coalitions to organise cabinet positions and ensure a Landtag majority for legislative purposes.

In the 2015 state election, the ÖVP and SPÖ suffered major losses to the FPÖ, which doubled its vote share to 30% and became the second largest party. The ÖVP, lacking a majority in the state council, subsequently signed a working agreement with the FPÖ.

Governor Josef Pühringer resigned in 2017 after 22 years in office. He was succeeded on 6 April by Deputy Governor and fellow ÖVP member Thomas Stelzer, who was elected by the Landtag with 51 of 55 votes.

Electoral system
The 56 seats of the Landtag of Upper Austria are elected via open list proportional representation in a two-step process. The seats are distributed between five multi-member constituencies. For parties to receive any representation in the Landtag, they must either win at least one seat in a constituency directly, or clear a 4 percent state-wide electoral threshold. Seats are distributed in constituencies according to the Hare quota, with any remaining seats allocated using the D'Hondt method at the state level, to ensure overall proportionality between a party's vote share and its share of seats.

Contesting parties
The table below lists parties represented in the previous Landtag.

In addition to the parties already represented in the Landtag, seven parties collected enough signatures to be placed on the ballot.

 NEOS – The New Upper Austria (NEOS)
 MFG – Austria: People – Freedom – Fundamental Rights (MFG)
 Communist Party of Austria and Independent Left (KPÖ)
 Best Upper Austria – Honest, Transparent and Open Electoral Platform (BESTE)
 UBB Independent Citizens' Movement (UBB) – on the ballot only in Linz and Surrounds, Hausruckviertel, and Mühlviertel
 Christian Party of Austria (CPÖ) – on the ballot only in Hausruckviertel, Traunviertel, and Mühlviertel
 Referendum  – on the ballot only in Linz and Surrounds and Hausruckviertel

Lead candidates

Opinion polling

Results

Results by constituency

Government formation
Compared to the previous legislative period, the ÖVP gained one state councillor while the FPÖ lost one, for a total of 5 ÖVP (includes the governor Thomas Stelzer), 2 FPÖ, 1 SPÖ, and 1 Greens. Three of the nine councillors will be women, up from zero in 2015. Compared to the previous election, 27 of the 56 members of the Landtag are new.

The ÖVP and FPÖ entered coalition talks after the election. On 20 October, they announced that they had successfully reached an agreement to renew their coalition. The contract was approved by the ÖVP and FPÖ party committees later the same day. The new governing contract emphasised further investment in renewable energy such as hydroelectric, wind, and photovoltaic systems on roofs, as well as more investment into public transportation, cancer research, and general research and development, and building Upper Austria as an economic hub. It also emphasised more traditional right-wing issues such as strengthening integration efforts for newly arrived migrants and offering fewer state benefits for those who refuse to participate.

The newly-elected state parliament convened on 23 October to invest the new government. Governor Stelzer was re-elected with 41 of 55 votes. The ÖVP–FPÖ coalition comprises 33 deputies, of which one member of the ÖVP was absent due to COVID quarantine, indicating that nine members of the opposition voted in favour. As the SPÖ and MFG indicated that they would vote against Stelzer's investiture, these votes likely came from the Greens (7 deputies) and NEOS (2). The new cabinet was also confirmed by the Landtag.

References

2021 elections in Austria
State elections in Austria
2021 events in Europe
Upper Austria